The Bulgarian Workers' Party /Communists/ is a communist party in Bulgaria led by Ivan Vodenicharski.

Since their foundation in 2000, the party has participated in only one parliamentary election; in 2001, it received 12,579 votes (0.3%) and no seats. In 2003 it fielded candidates for 22 local councils, but fail to win any seats.

Internationally, BRP/k/ has been one of the founding members of  the International Coordination of Revolutionary Parties and Organizations (ICOR) and remains one of its 62 members.

References

External links
 Bulgarian Worker's Party /Communists/ on Facebook

Political parties established in 2000
Bulgaria, Bulgarian Workers' Party Communists
Stalinist parties
Anti-revisionist organizations
2000 establishments in Bulgaria